The 2017 World Junior Ice Hockey Championships was the 41st edition of the Ice Hockey World Junior Championship (WJC or WM20). The main tournament was co-hosted by the Bell Centre in Montreal, Quebec and the Air Canada Centre in Toronto, Ontario. This was the 14th championship that Canada had hosted. Montreal and Toronto also jointly hosted the 2015 edition. The tournament consisted of 30 games between 10 nations.

Group A preliminary games, as well as the medal rounds, were hosted by the Bell Centre in Montreal. The Air Canada Centre in Toronto hosted preliminaries in Group B, including the host country of Canada. The tournament also initiated several year-long celebrations, the 375th anniversary of Montreal's founding; the 100th anniversary of the National Hockey League's founding in Montreal; the 100th anniversary of Hockey Canada's origins; the 50th anniversary of Montreal's Expo 67; the 150th anniversary of Canadian confederation; and the 100th anniversary of the Toronto Maple Leafs. The Maple Leafs had planned to make the WJHC the centrepiece of their 100th-anniversary celebrations.

The event was organized by Hockey Canada, Hockey Québec, Ontario Hockey Federation, Montreal Canadiens, Maple Leaf Sports & Entertainment and Evenko. Montreal and Quebec provided C$1 million and C$2 million in funding, respectively, for both the 2015 and 2017 editions.

For the first time in the history of the event, the defending champion (Finland) had to compete in the relegation round. Latvia was relegated to Division I-A for 2018 by merit of their tenth-place finish.

Player eligibility 
A player was eligible to play in the 2017 World Junior Ice Hockey Championships if:
 the player was of male gender;
 the player was born at the earliest in 1997, and at the latest, in 2002;
 the player was a citizen in the country he represented;
 the player was under the jurisdiction of a national association that was a member of the IIHF.

If a player who has never played in IIHF-organized competition wishes to switch national eligibility, he must have played in competitions for two consecutive years in the new country without playing in another country, as well as show his move to the new country's national association with an international transfer card. In case the player has previously played in IIHF-organized competition but wishes to switch national eligibility, he must have played in competitions for four consecutive years in the new country without playing in another country, he must show his move to the new country's national association with an international transfer card, as well as be a citizen of the new country. A player may only switch national eligibility once.

Top Division

Venues

Officials
The International Ice Hockey Federation selected 12 referees and 10 linesmen to officiate during the tournament:

Referees
  Tobias Björk
  Darcy Burchell
  Jan Hribik
  Jozef Kubus
  Mark Lemelin
  Marcus Linde
  Marian Rohatsch
  Anssi Salonen
  Brett Sheva
  Maxim Sidorenko
  Robin Šír
  Daniel Stricker

Linesmen
  Jimmy Dahmen
  Jake Davis
  Nicolas Fluri
  Dmitry Golyak
  Henrik Haurum
  Lukas Kohlmuller
  Yakov Paley
  Libor Suchanek
  Sakari Suominen
  Nathan Vanoosten

Rosters

Format
The four best ranked teams from each group of the preliminary round advanced to the quarterfinals, while the last-placed team from both groups played a relegation round in a best-of-three format to determine the relegated team.

Preliminary round 

All times are local. (Eastern Standard Time – UTC−5)

Group A

Group B

Relegation

Note:  was relegated for the 2018 World Junior Ice Hockey Championships

Playoff round

Quarterfinals

Semifinals

Bronze medal game

Final

Statistics

Scoring leaders 

GP = Games played; G = Goals; A = Assists; Pts = Points; +/− = Plus–minus; PIM = Penalties in minutesSource: IIHF

Goaltending leaders 

(minimum 40% team's total ice time)

TOI = Time On Ice (minutes:seconds); GA = Goals against; GAA = Goals against average; Sv% = Save percentage; SO = ShutoutsSource: IIHF

Tournament awards
Reference: 
Most Valuable Player
 Defenceman:  Thomas Chabot

All-star team
 Goaltender:  Ilya Samsonov
 Defencemen:  Thomas Chabot,  Charlie McAvoy
 Forwards:  Kirill Kaprizov,  Alexander Nylander,  Clayton Keller

IIHF best player awards
 Goaltender:  Felix Sandström
 Defenceman:  Thomas Chabot
 Forward:  Kirill Kaprizov

Final standings

Division I

Group A
The tournament was held in Bremerhaven, Germany from 11–17 December 2016.

Group B
The tournament was held in Budapest, Hungary from 11–17 December 2016.  The hosts, entering as the bottom seed, won promotion for the second year in a row.

Division II

Group A
The tournament was held in Tallinn, Estonia from 11–17 December 2016.

Group B
The tournament was held in Logroño, Spain from 7–13 January 2017.

Division III

The tournament was held in Dunedin, New Zealand from 16–22 January 2017.  Turkey defeated China in the Gold medal game to achieve promotion to Division II.  Chinese Taipei returned to play for the first time since 2011, losing all but their final game.

See also

 2015 World Junior Ice Hockey Championship when Toronto & Montreal co-hosted
 2012 World Junior Ice Hockey Championships when Calgary & Edmonton co-hosted
 2010 World Junior Ice Hockey Championships when Saskatoon & Regina co-hosted
 2009 World Junior Ice Hockey Championships when Ottawa hosted

References

External links
  

 
2017 World Junior Ice Hockey Championships
World Junior Ice Hockey Championships
2017
2017 World Junior Ice Hockey Championships
World Junior Ice Hockey Championships
2017 World Junior Ice Hockey Championships
2017 World Junior Ice Hockey Championships
World Junior Ice Hockey
2010s in Montreal
2016 in Quebec
World Junior Ice Hockey
2017 in Quebec
December 2016 sports events in Canada
January 2017 sports events in Canada
International sports competitions in Toronto